Chester County is a county located in the U.S. state of South Carolina. As of the 2020 census, its population was 32,294. Its county seat is Chester.

Chester County is included in the Charlotte-Concord-Gastonia, NC-SC Metropolitan Statistical Area.

History 
The county was founded in 1785 and was named after Chester, PA. The largest city and county seat is Chester, the county is also included in the Charlotte-Concord-Gastonia, NC-SC Metropolitan Statistical Area.

Geography

National protected area
 Sumter National Forest (part)

State and local protected areas 
 Chester State Park
 Landsford Canal State Park
 Woods Ferry Recreation Area

Major water bodies 
 Broad River
 Catawba River
 Chester Reservoir
 Great Falls Lake
 Fishing Creek Lake

Adjacent counties 
 York County - north
 Lancaster County - east
 Fairfield County - south
 Union County - west

Major highways

Demographics

2020 census

As of the 2020 United States census, there were 32,294 people, 12,653 households, and 8,042 families residing in the county.

2010 census
As of the 2010 United States Census, there were 33,140 people, 12,876 households, and 9,073 families living in the county. The racial makeup of the county was 59.8% white, 37.4% black or African American, 0.4% American Indian, 0.3% Asian, 0.6% from other races, and 1.5% from two or more races. Those of Hispanic or Latino origin made up 1.4% of the population. In terms of ancestry, 19.9% were American, 7.5% were Irish, 5.6% were English, and 5.1% were German.

Of the 12,876 households, 34.1% had children under the age of 18 living with them, 44.5% were married couples living together, 19.8% had a female householder with no husband present, 29.5% were non-families, and 25.9% of all households were made up of individuals. The average household size was 2.56 and the average family size was 3.04. The median age was 40.3 years.

The median income for a household in the county was $32,743 and the median income for a family was $42,074. Males had a median income of $39,008 versus $27,701 for females. The per capita income for the county was $17,687. About 18.6% of families and 21.4% of the population were below the poverty line, including 30.0% of those under age 18 and 18.0% of those age 65 or over.

2000 census
As of the census of 2000, there were 34,068 people, 12,880 households, and 9,338 families living in the county.  The population density was 59 people per square mile (23/km2).  There were 14,374 housing units at an average density of 25 per square mile (10/km2).  The racial makeup of the county was 59.93% White, 38.65% Black or African American, 0.33% Native American, 0.28% Asian, 0.01% Pacific Islander, 0.25% from other races, and 0.55% from two or more races.  0.75% of the population were Hispanic or Latino of any race.

There were 12,880 households, out of which 32.90% had children under the age of 18 living with them, 48.80% were married couples living together, 18.60% had a female householder with no husband present, and 27.50% were non-families. 24.20% of all households were made up of individuals, and 9.90% had someone living alone who was 65 years of age or older.  The average household size was 2.62 and the average family size was 3.11.

In the county, the population was spread out, with 26.90% under the age of 18, 8.40% from 18 to 24, 28.20% from 25 to 44, 23.80% from 45 to 64, and 12.70% who were 65 years of age or older.  The median age was 36 years. For every 100 females there were 92.50 males.  For every 100 females age 18 and over, there were 87.60 males.

The median income for a household in the county was $32,425, and the median income for a family was $38,087. Males had a median income of $30,329 versus $21,570 for females. The per capita income for the county was $14,709.  About 11.90% of families and 15.30% of the population were below the poverty line, including 21.20% of those under age 18 and 14.90% of those age 65 or over.

Law and government

Law enforcement
In 2021, Chester County Sheriff Alex Underwood was found guilty of conspiracy, wire fraud, deprivation of rights and federal program theft, and sentenced to one year in prison.

Politics

Economy 
Chester County's economy has an industrial and agricultural base with large areas used for timber production. There are several sawmills  in the county and others near it. Forest land ownership is majority family landowners who manage their properties for a variety of uses. Agriculture is also a big segment of the economy with crops consisting of cotton, wheat, oats, rye, beef and dairy cattle, hay, corn, peaches, other vegetables, peanuts, soybeans, and pecans.

Media
 Chester Vision or CSN
 Chester News & Reporter
 WRBK, 90.3 FM, a noncommercial station that primarily features classic oldies

Communities

City
 Chester (county seat and largest city)

Towns
 Fort Lawn
 Great Falls
 Lowrys
 Richburg

Census-designated places
 Eureka Mill
 Gayle Mill

Unincorporated communities
 Blackstock
 Edgemoor
 Lando
 Leeds
 Wilksburg

Notable people
 John Adair, (1757–1840), born in Chester County (although at the time it was believed to be part of Anson County, North Carolina), became a member of the United States House of Representatives and the United States Senate, and the 8th governor of Kentucky
 Thomas and Meeks Griffin, were wrongly executed in South Carolina by electric chair in 1915. They were framed in Chester County in 1913 and pardoned in 2009.

See also
 List of counties in South Carolina
 National Register of Historic Places listings in Chester County, South Carolina
 South Carolina State Parks
 List of national forests of the United States
 Tryon County, North Carolina

References

External links 

 
 
 Chester County history and images

 
1785 establishments in South Carolina
Populated places established in 1785